Domenico Tibaldi (1541-1583) was an Italian painter and architect, active mainly in Bologna, in a Renaissance style.

Domenico initially trained with his father, the famed Mannerist painter and architect Pellegrino Tibaldi. He helped construct a chapel in the Bologna Cathedral. He helped design the Palazzo Magnani in central Bologna. He died young and was buried in the church of the Nunziata in Bologna.

Sources
 The lives of celebrated architects, ancient and modern, Volume 2, By Francesco Milizia; J. Moyes, editor, London; Page 64.

1541 births
1583 deaths
16th-century Italian architects
Renaissance architects
Architects from Bologna